Richard Andrew Laviolette (born August 22, 1982) is a Canadian singer-songwriter based in Guelph, Ontario. He has released material under a variety of band names, including Mary Carl, Richard Laviolette and His Black Lungs, Richard Laviolette and the Oil Spills,  Richard Laviolette and the Hollow Hooves and "Richard Laviolette and the Glitter Bombs".

Earl life and education 

Laviolette grew up on a small hobby beef farm west of Tara, Ontario. In his youth, he learned to play several instruments, including the mandolin and guitar, from his father, becoming proficient in traditional folk and country mandolin styles. In an interview with the Queen's The Journal, he says his family played an important role in fostering an appreciation for music. His parents, Darrell and Marie, were both musical, holding family sing-alongs and jamborees. Growing up, he did not have much exposure to non-mainstream music, but his family would regularly play music together. He studied history before dropping out to pursue music full time. 

When Laviolette entered high school, he was introduced to musicians that did not receive much mainstream exposure, such as Hayden and Elliott Smith. During his teenage years, he played in several bands throughout the Tara, Chesley and Owen Sound areas of Ontario. Along with Matt Gowan and some of his family members, he formed the band Sharp Pointy Stick, which played a number of high school and bar gigs in the Southwestern Ontario area.

Laviolette attended the University of Guelph with the intention of becoming a teacher. He studied history before dropping out to pursue music full-time.

Career

His debut album was begun in autumn 2003 under the name Mary Carl, while he was still a student at Guelph. Mary Carl, the person whom the band was named after, reportedly resented the name. The album was recorded in the bedroom of friend Adam Scott, with Michelle Dyck contributing additional vocals.  Incorporating guitar, cello, harmonica, piano, accordion, and floor tom, Mary Carl was released on April 1, 2005.

His second album, A Little Less Like a Rock, a Little More Like Home, released on Burnt Oak Records in 2006. It reached spot 127 on the campus/community radio airplay charts in November 2006. He followed up with the albums Aging Recycling Plant in 2009 and All of Your Raw Materials in 2010. 

Laviolette frequently collaborates with other artists. In late September 2007, Laviolette and label-mate Kit Wilson-Yang made a seven-week tour of the United States and Canada. His 2017 album Taking the Long Way Home featured piano by Lisa Bozikovic and backing vocals by Jessy Bell Smith. The album began as a project with his father, who had to step away to care for Laviolette's ailing mother who had Huntington's disease. The album was released by You've Changed Records and was produced by Andy Magoffin at House of Miracles in Cambridge, Ontario.

He has performed at such music festivals as Pop Montreal and the Hillside Festival. Exclaim! has described Laviolette as an "old soul", with a voice that "can swing from a delicate whisper to a guttural bark in the same breath". The Record in Kitchener has said Laviolette is on "the cutting edge of the local scene", along with James Gordon's son Geordie Gordon.

Discography 
 Mary Carl (2005)
 A Little Less Like a Rock, a Little More Like Home (2006)
 Hands and Feats (with Kit Wilson-Yang) (2007)
 Aging Recycling Plant (2009)
 All of Your Raw Materials (2010)
 Soundtrack to the Life of a Car Nearly Driving into the Pacific (2010)
 Over the Roar of the Engine (Richard Laviolette and the Glitter Bombs, 2013)
 Taking the Long Way Home (2017)

References

External links 
 Richard Laviolette on Myspace
 Richard Laviolette at New Music Canada

1982 births
Living people
People from Bruce County
Franco-Ontarian people
Canadian singer-songwriters
Canadian indie rock musicians
21st-century Canadian male singers
Canadian male singer-songwriters